As You Make Your Way is the third studio release by Rhode Island-based singer-songwriter Marc Douglas Berardo.

In Shellie Byrum's review of the album she wrote,  "It's a good feeling when music can hit on the emotions of your past, and that's what many will get from As You Make Your Way."

Track listing
All songs written by Marc Douglas Berardo
 "Today" – 4:25 
 "Untethered" – 3:25 
 "The Rum Diary" – 4:48
 "For Real" – 4:19
 "Just One" – 5:50
 "On the Nights When I Can't Sleep" – 4:11 
 "Traveling" – 5:21
 "The Story (Life After Hemingway)"  4:29
 "Happy" – 5:44
 "As You Make Your Way" – 4:44

Personnel

Musicians
 Marc Douglas Berardo – vocals, acoustic guitar, percussion, box drum kit, harmony vocals
 Dick Neal – organ, banjo, electric slide guitar, pedal steel guitar, keyboards, piano, mandolin, Dobro 
 Pete Szymanski – bass
 Nicky Vitiello – drums 
 Chris Berardo – harmonica, harmony vocals, jembe, tambourine
 Chris Teskey – Squeeze box
 Choir on Just One – Mike LaSalla, Leejay, Emily Hron Weigle, Bill West, Dick Neal, Pete Symanski, and Marc Douglas Berardo

Production
Produced by: Dick Neal 
Engineered by: Pete Szymanski
Mixed by: Dick Neal and Marc Douglas Berardo assisted by Pete Szymanski
Recorded by: Gene Paul at DB Plus, New York City, March 2003

Artwork
Photography: Kim Mitchell
Graphic Design and Layout: Chris Brown

References

2003 albums
Marc Douglas Berardo albums